Tulbagh, named after Dutch Cape Colony Governor Ryk Tulbagh, is a town located in the "Land van Waveren" mountain basin (also known as the Tulbagh basin), in the Winelands of the Western Cape, South Africa. The basin is fringed on three sides by mountains, and is drained by the Klein Berg River and its tributaries.

History
The basin has been inhabited for thousands of years by indigenous Bushmen and Khoi-San peoples. It was about 300 years ago when, after a land grant by the Dutch Colonial Government to a more or less equal number of Dutch and Huguenot settlers to settle the area, that the town of Tulbagh was founded. The region was named "Land van Waveren" in 1699 by Willem Adriaan van der Stel in honour of the Oetgens van Waveren family, from which his mother was descended. Before this date, but also subsequent to it, the region had also been known as Roodezand ("red sand"). The region corresponds to the present Tulbagh district, named after Governor Ryk Tulbagh. The town developed slowly and over time and in the period many notable examples of Cape Dutch architecture, Victorian and Edwardian houses and other buildings such as the Oude Kerk (1743) and the Oude Drosdy (the original colonial Magistrate's complex) were built.

1969 earthquake 

In September 1969 the Boland area was hit by an earthquake that caused considerable damage to the town of Tulbagh. Many of the Church Street buildings were destroyed. The extent of the damage was aptly described by the Journal Bulletin of the Simon van der Stel Foundation in 1973: "A street that somehow captured the essential spirit of a unique culture looked as if it was in the throes of a nightmare: many fine gables had either tumbled or were totally destroyed, whole sections of many houses had collapsed, most of the soft brick walls had burst open in wide cracks, plaster had been torn by off in large sheets, rafters and roofs had caved in. Everything appeared to be in total and irreparable ruin."

After the disaster in Church Street, extensive projects of restoration began with the National Committee for the Restoration of Historic Buildings in Tulbagh and its Environment. Because of this work Tulbagh now contains possibly the largest number of Cape-Dutch, Edwardian and Victorian provincial heritage sites in one street in South Africa, and remains a major tourist attraction of the town to the present day. The work started by the committee has been continued to the present day by various residents of Tulbagh, but also significantly by the Tulbagh Valley Heritage Foundation, which aims to restore and maintain "all structures older than 60 years, the cultural landscape and undeveloped properties connected to the historical structures above".

Geography
The basin experiences a type of Mediterranean climate. The southern side is open to cooling south-east winds during the hot summer months. Accordingly, Tulbagh enjoys some of the most diverse and attractive conditions for viticulture in the Cape, and the differences in terroir available to wine makers allow for a wide diversity of distinctive wines.

The Groot Winterhoek Mountains are part of the Cape Fold Belt. They rise to a maximum height of  just north of the town of Tulbagh as Groot Winterhoek peak. The Groot Winterhoek Wilderness Area, operated by CapeNature, comprises a conservation area of 30,608 ha.

Flora and Fauna
Many animals, such as baboons, bat-eared foxes, lynxes, and smaller species of antelope, live in parts of the valley, and it is known that leopards still occur in the mountains . Baboons are a common sight on the pass. The Witzenberg Valley is home to a wide variety of birds, including the Cape sugarbird and Verreaux's eagle.

The most conspicuous components of the flora are evergreen sclerophyllous plants, many with ericoid leaves and gracile habit, as opposed to timber forest. Several plant families are conspicuous in fynbos; the Proteaceae are prominent, with genera such as Protea, Leucospermum (the "pincushions"), and Leucadendron (the silver tree and "cone bushes"). Proteas are represented by many species and are prominent in the landscape, generally with large striking flowers, many of which are pollinated by birds, and others by small mammals.

Tulbagh today

Events

Tulbagh hosts various events every year. In June, the village Christmas in Winter; in September the Tulbagh Spring Arts Festival showcases a variety of visual and performing arts; and the annual Tulbagh Horse & Wildflower Show. Tulbagh has also previously hosted the Absa Cape Epic mountain bike stage race.

Wine production 

Wine has been produced for many years in the basin on a commercial scale, but only recently have large advances been made. There are now numerous wine estates in and around the town. The importance of this industry for the vicinity is substantial, so much so that many of the producers are now part of the Tulbagh Wine Route and this is attracting increasing numbers of tourists to Tulbagh who are eager to sample the wines produced by the members.  Many new vineyards have been planted and more private cellars are either being planned or built to cope with the expected production volumes of quality wines.

Tulbagh also has two nearby schools: one named Waveren Hoërskool (Waveren Highschool) and another named Tulbagh Hoër (Tulbagh High).

See also

 List of heritage sites in Tulbagh
 Louis Michel Thibault

References

Further information 
 
 

Populated places in the Witzenberg Local Municipality
Populated places established in 1795
1795 establishments in the Dutch Empire